Calliclava pallida is a species of sea snail, a marine gastropod mollusk in the family Drilliidae.

Description
The shell grows to a length of  24 mm. The ribs are deflected at the periphery but continuous to the suture, sharp and rather close, interstices with fine revolving striae. The anal sinus is broad and deep. The siphonal canal is very short and a little recurved. The ground color of the shell is white.

Distribution
This species occurs in the Pacific Ocean from Mexico to Colombia.

References

External links
 

pallida
Gastropods described in 1834